Clavija domingensis is a species of plant in the family Primulaceae.

Description
The long simple leaves grow from the top of the trunk, giving the plant a palm-like appearance. The long leathery leaves inspired the Haitian Creole name of the plant: lang bèf ( "cow's tongue"). Flowers and fruit are born on long pending racemes.

Range
This species is endemic to the Massif de la Hotte on the Tiburon Peninsula in South Western Haiti.

Habitat

Ecology

Etymology
The species has been given the specific epithet "domingensis", as it occurs on the island of Hispaniola. This island was historically called Santo Domingo, or Saint-Domingue.

Taxonomy

References

Primulaceae
Flora of Haiti
Flora without expected TNC conservation status